Serena Williams defeated the two-time defending champion, her sister Venus Williams, in the final, 7–6(7–4), 6–3 to win the ladies' singles tennis title at the 2002 Wimbledon Championships. It was her first Wimbledon singles title, third major singles title overall, and the second component of her first "Serena Slam," a non-calendar year Grand Slam and career Grand Slam. She also claimed the world No. 1 singles ranking for the first time by winning the tournament. She achieved the 'Channel Slam' (winning the French Open and Wimbledon in the same year), the first time this feat was achieved since Steffi Graf in 1996 and a feat she would accomplish again in 2015. Williams did not lose a set during the tournament.

Seeds

  Venus Williams (final)
  Serena Williams (champion)
  Jennifer Capriati (quarterfinals)
  Monica Seles (quarterfinals)
  Kim Clijsters (second round)
  Justine Henin (semifinals)
  Jelena Dokic (fourth round)
  Sandrine Testud (second round)
  Amélie Mauresmo (semifinals)
  Silvia Farina Elia (third round)
  Daniela Hantuchová (quarterfinals)
  Elena Dementieva (fourth round)
  Meghann Shaughnessy (second round)
  Iroda Tulyaganova (second round)
  Anna Smashnova (first round)
  Lisa Raymond (fourth round)

  Patty Schnyder (second round)
  Anastasia Myskina (third round)
  Magdalena Maleeva (fourth round)
  Tamarine Tanasugarn (fourth round)
  Tatiana Panova (third round)
  Anne Kremer (second round)
  Iva Majoli (third round)
  Alexandra Stevenson (first round)
  Nathalie Dechy (third round)
  Dája Bedáňová (third round)
  Ai Sugiyama (third round)
  Paola Suárez (first round)
  Barbara Schett (second round)
  Clarisa Fernández (second round)
  Nicole Pratt (first round)
  Amanda Coetzer (second round)

Qualifying

Draw

Finals

Top half

Section 1

Section 2

Section 3

Section 4

Bottom half

Section 5

Section 6

Section 7

Section 8

References

External links

2002 Wimbledon Championships on WTAtennis.com
2002 Wimbledon Championships – Women's draws and results at the International Tennis Federation

Women's Singles
Wimbledon Championship by year – Women's singles
Wimbledon Championships
Wimbledon Championships
Wimbledon